Nelli Privalova (born 7 February 1945 in Tallinn) is an Estonian journalist and politician. She has been member of IX, X and XI Riigikogu.

She is a member of Estonian Centre Party.

References

1945 births
Living people
Estonian journalists
Estonian Centre Party politicians
Members of the Riigikogu, 1999–2003
Members of the Riigikogu, 2003–2007
Members of the Riigikogu, 2007–2011
Women members of the Riigikogu
Saint Petersburg State University alumni
People from Tallinn
Politicians from Tallinn
21st-century Estonian women politicians